Patricia Legrand is a French actress who specializes in dubbing.

Roles

Television animation
The Adventures of Tintin (Zorrino)
Argai: The Prophecy (Miss Moon)
Back to the Future: The Animated Series (Clara Brown)
Batman: The Animated Series (Renee Montoya, Talia al Ghul)
Cardcaptor Sakura (Sakura Kinomoto)
Chowder (Panini)
Cowboy Bebop (Edward Wong Hau Pepelu Tivrusky IV)
Ghost in the Shell: Stand Alone Complex (Tachikoma)
Haibane Renmei (Rakka)
Hamtaro (Hamtaro)
Looney Tunes (Tweety Bird)
The Magic School Bus (Dorothy Ann)
Mr. Men and Little Miss (Additional voices)
Princess Gwenevere and the Jewel Riders (Spike, Cleo, Sugar)
Rayman: The Animated Series (Betina)
Redwall (Cornflower)
Secret of Cerulean Sand (Jane Buxton)
Sonic Underground (Sonia the Hedgehog)
Tico of the Seven Seas (Maggie)
The Vision of Escaflowne (Merle)
The Wacky World of Tex Avery (Khannie, Maurice)
The Loud House (Luna Loud)

OVA
Karas (Amefurikozō)

Theatrical animation
Escaflowne (Merle)
James and the Giant Peach (Glowworm)

Video games
Crash: Mind over Mutant (Coco Bandicoot, Nina Cortex, Brat Girls)
Crash Nitro Kart (Coco Bandicoot)
Crash of the Titans (Coco Bandicoot, Nina Cortex, Brat Girls)
Crash Tag Team Racing (Coco Bandicoot, Nina Cortex)
Crash Twinsanity (Coco Bandicoot)
Moshi Monsters Friends (Kazuki, Tingaling, Scamp)
Cookie Run: Kingdom (Strawberry Crepe Cookie)

Live Action
Baby Mama (Angela "Angie" Ostrowiski)
Dr. Quinn, Medicine Woman (Brian Cooper)
Family Matters (Judy Winslow, Richie Crawford, Maxine Johnson)
Men in Trees (Mai Washington)
Pushing Daisies (Olive Snook)
Scooby-Doo 2: Monsters Unleashed (Velma Dinkley)
Space Jam (Tweety Bird)
The Magic Voyage (Marilyn)
The West Wing (Annabeth Schott)
The Young and the Restless (Cassie Newman)

External links
 

French video game actresses
French voice actresses
French voice directors
Living people
1960 births